Miliusa nilagirica is a species of plant in the Annonaceae family. It is endemic to India.

References

nilagirica
Flora of Karnataka
Flora of Kerala
Flora of Tamil Nadu
Vulnerable plants
Taxonomy articles created by Polbot